Robin Cardwell Young (née Youngs) is an American television and radio personality. She worked ten years in television, winning the Peabody Award for her documentary The Los Altos Story. In 2000, she shifted to radio in Boston. Young co-hosts the NPR and WBUR daily news magazine program Here and Now along with Scott Tong and Deepa Fernandes.

Early life and education
Young was born in Long Island, New York. She attended Ithaca College in Ithaca, New York, graduating in 1972. The College gave her the Outstanding Young Alumni Award in 1982. She has lived and worked in Manhattan, Washington, DC, Los Angeles and Boston.

Her three siblings are all actors. Gail Youngs and Jim Youngs are her sister and brother. Her third sibling is veteran film actor John Savage.

Career in broadcasting
She began in television as a secretary at Channel 38 in Boston in 1973. In 1975, she went on air as a radio announcer at WBZ (Boston). She made her first television appearance on WBZ-TV's Evening Magazine in 1977. From 1982 to 1983, Young was lead presenter, along with Tom Ellis, for the revamped evening newscasts on WNEV-TV (now WHDH) Channel 7.

After one year, she switched her role at the station and began hosting and producing a number of primetime specials under her own production company, Young Visions.  In 1988, Young was "Life" section anchor of USA Today: The Television Show, a nationally syndicated news program.

She made the documentary The Los Altos Story, promoting HIV/AIDS awareness; she won the Peabody Award in 1990 for this program.

Young has hosted Here and Now since 2000. The show normally consists of five interview segments with reporters, politicians, artists, authors and experts on a given subject. It is broadcast from noon to 2 pm on WBUR and is distributed by NPR. In July 2013, Here and Now expanded to two hours. The show is produced at WBUR in Boston.

Awards
Young has won the Peabody and CableACE Awards for documentary film making and five Emmy Awards for excellence in broadcasting. She was inducted into the Massachusetts Broadcasters Hall of Fame in 2010.

References

External links
Here and Now official website

American public radio personalities
Television anchors from Boston
Emmy Award winners
Ithaca College alumni
Public Radio International personalities
Living people
Year of birth missing (living people)
Film producers from Massachusetts
American film directors
People from Long Island
Journalists from New York (state)
20th-century American journalists
21st-century American journalists
Peabody Award winners
CableACE Award winners